Thomas Abraham Misch (born 25 June 1995) is an English musician and producer. He began releasing music on SoundCloud in 2012 and released his debut studio album Geography in 2018. In 2020, he released his second studio album What Kinda Music in collaboration with English jazz drummer Yussef Dayes, distributed through Blue Note Records and Caroline.

Early life and education
Misch studied music technology at Langley Park School for Boys and later, in 2014, enrolled in a jazz guitar course at Trinity Laban Conservatoire of Music and Dance in Greenwich but left after six months to focus on his own music. He began learning to play the violin at age 4, later learning to play the guitar.

Discography

Studio albums

Extended plays

Mixtapes

Singles

As lead artist

As featured artist

Other certified songs

Other guest appearances

Remixes

References

External links

 

1995 births
21st-century English singers
Alumni of Trinity Laban Conservatoire of Music and Dance
English jazz guitarists
English male guitarists
English violinists
English multi-instrumentalists
English record producers
Living people
People from Beckenham
21st-century British guitarists
21st-century violinists
21st-century British male singers
Musicians from London